Schoharie Creek is a river in New York that flows north  from the foot of Indian Head Mountain in the Catskills through the Schoharie Valley to the Mohawk River. It is twice impounded north of Prattsville to create New York City's Schoharie Reservoir and the Blenheim-Gilboa Power Project.

During the American Revolutionary War, Iroquois Indian attacks against the cluster of farms in the valley of the Cobleskill Creek tributary was the site of the Cobleskill Massacre (May 1778), virtually depopulating settlements in the southern Mohawk valley. News of this and two other mixed Tory-Indian guerrilla attacks led to an appropriation of funds for the Sullivan Expedition dispatched by General Washington in 1779 to break the threat of Indian raids.

The Erie Canal crossed over the creek by an aqueduct at Schoharie Crossing State Historic Site.

Two notable bridge collapses have occurred on Schoharie Creek. In 1987, two spans of the New York State Thruway collapsed. On August 28, 2011, the covered Old Blenheim Bridge collapsed due to flooding from Hurricane Irene.

Geography

Watershed and tributary streams
Schoharie Creek is part of the drainage system of the Hudson River watershed and a direct tributary of the Mohawk River. Tributaries of Schoharie Creek, listed from upstream to downstream, include:

East side 
 Gooseberry Creek
 Red Kill
 East Kill
 John Chase Brook
 Batavia Kill
 Hunterfield Creek
 Platter Kill
 Keyser Kill
 Little Schoharie Creek
 Stony Brook
 Fox Creek
 Bowman Creek

West side 
 Roaring Kill
 Cook Brook
 West Kill
 Little West Kill
 Johnson Hollow Brook
 Bear Kill
 Mine Kill
 West Kill
 Cole Brook
 Panther Creek
 Pleasant Valley Creek
 Line Creek
 Cobleskill Creek
 Cripplebush Creek
 Fly Creek
 Wilsey Creek
 Irish Creek

Watershed
Before European colonization, the watershed was mostly forested with a few small areas cleared by Native Americans for hunting. Early European settlers attempted to farm the land, but soon abandoned it due to the short growing seasons, steep slopes and rocky soil. Between 1800 and the early 1900s, mills, the tanning industry, quarrying for bluestone, logging, railroads, and resorts cleared the Catskills of most of its forest cover. Starting in the early 1900s, these industries began to decline and areas that were previously cleared have grown back into forest. As of 2001, approximately 85% of the Schoharie Creek's watershed has been classified as forested.

Hydrology

Water quality
New York's Department of Environmental Conservation (DEC) rates the water quality of Schoharie Creek in different sections. The section from Cobleskill Creek to Pleasant Valley Brook is rated Class C, which is most suitable for fishing, but can also be suitable for primary and secondary contact recreation. Stream flow on the lower Schoharie is significantly influenced by the Schoharie Reservoir. Flow from the reservoir is restricted when the dam is not open, and the lack of flow mostly during the summer increases water temperature, which negatively affects the fishery. Also this section flows through an agricultural valley, which contributes to increased sediment in the creek. This increases streambank erosion and sediment loadings, and during high flows, cause the creek's turbidity to increase. Biological tests were conducted in Fort Hunter in 2001, then in Burtonsville in 2001, and showed non-impacted water quality conditions at both sites.

Discharge
The United States Geological Survey (USGS) maintains many stream gauges along Schoharie Creek.

The station in Schoharie is located upstream from bridge on County Highway 1A has been in operation since December 2017, takes gauge height measurements only. The station in Esperance is located by the US Route 20 bridge has been in operation since December 2017, takes gauge height measurements only.

Turbidity
The USGS station along the creek near Burtonsville, collects turbidity data every 15 minutes. The maximum daily suspended sediment concentrations (SSC) mean was 1460 mg/L on June 14, 2013, and the minimum was 2 mg/L on October 1–2, 2014. On June 14, 2013, the maximum daily suspended sediment discharge was 48,400 tons on June 14, 2013, and .16 tons on October 1–2, 2014.

History
In the 18th century, areas of the south (or right bank) side of Mohawk Valley were sparsely settled in the face of the periodically warlike and always militant Iroquois peoples, who, while diminished by European diseases during colonial times still retained ample war powers after the French and Indian War ended in 1763. Reorganized by then as the Six Nations the tribes had conducted internecine war with other powerful eastern tribes until the 1770s, weakening or eliminating the power of the Delaware, the Susquehanna, and Shawnee tribes— affecting Amerindian populations and power both East and West of the Alleghenies as far south as northern Kentucky in the west, and southern Maryland in the east. By the end of the French and Indian War, they were the one remaining group of eastern native peoples that retained sufficient military power to give even the British authorities pause. Consequently, those authorities cultivated political arrangements with the Iroquois and as a prelude to the revolution, the British Crown acted to block trans-Appalachian settlements before the opening of the American Revolution, one of the lesser known grievances of many held by the settlers.
  
During the Revolution, farms in the valley acted as a breadbasket providing important food supplies to the Colonial forces.  The lower Mohawk valley was a scene of uneasy native Amerindian–Colonial Settler contention throughout most of the 18th century until after the American Revolutionary War's Sullivan Expedition pacified the region by permanently weakening the Six Nations of the Iroquois. That campaign was a direct result of two atrocities in the region: The May 1778 Battle of Cobleskill (or Cobleskill Creek Massacre) signaled a new guerrilla war offensive by mixed troops of Loyalists and members of the four Iroquois tribes allied to the British in 1778. The incursions resulted in three major raids with major loss of life ranging from Southern New York to Wilkes-Barre, Pennsylvania.

New York State Thruway bridge collapse

On the morning of April 5, 1987, after 30 years of service, two spans of the New York State Thruway bridge over Schoharie Creek near Fort Hunter collapsed. Five vehicles fell into the flooded river, resulting in ten deaths. A subsequent investigation of the collapse determined the cause to be scour. At the time, the creek was higher and flowing faster than normal due to excessive rains in the area. To cope with the overload, the dam released water into the Schoharie Creek according to the rate at which it was entering the reservoir from upstream, adding to the load in the creek. The segment of NY 5S near Fort Hunter was reconfigured to carry westbound Thruway traffic while the bridge was rebuilt. The eastbound replacement bridge was completed and fully open to traffic on December 7, 1987, and the westbound replacement bridge was opened on May 21, 1988.

Old Blenheim Bridge
The Old Blenheim Bridge, one of the longest and oldest single-span covered bridges in the world, formerly spanned the creek. The bridge was destroyed on August 28, 2011 by flooding resulting from Hurricane Irene.

See also

List of rivers in New York

References

External links

The Collapse of the Schoharie Creek Bridge

Rivers of New York (state)
Schoharie, New York
Tributaries of the Hudson River
Rivers of Greene County, New York
Rivers of Schoharie County, New York
Rivers of Albany County, New York
Rivers of Schenectady County, New York
Rivers of Montgomery County, New York